Kala is a rural locality (a selo) in Amsarsky Selsoviet, Rutulsky District, Republic of Dagestan, Russia. The population was  408 as of 2010. There are 3 streets.

Geography 
Kala is located 9 km northwest of Rutul (the district's administrative centre) by road. Kufa and Amsar are the nearest rural localities.

Nationalities 
Rutuls live there.

References 

Rural localities in Rutulsky District